Racha Taki is a Lebanese actress. She is from an artistic family where her mother is the Syrian actress Sabah Al Jazairi and her aunt is the comedian Samia Al Jazairi.

References

External links 
 

Syrian television actresses
Syrian people of Lebanese descent
Lebanese television actresses
People from Damascus
Damascus University alumni
Living people
Lebanese people of Syrian descent
Higher Institute of Dramatic Arts (Damascus) alumni
21st-century Lebanese actresses
21st-century Syrian actresses
1985 births